Alison Donnell is an academic, originally from the United Kingdom. She is Professor of Modern Literatures and Head of the School of Literature, Drama and Creative Writing at the University of East Anglia. She was previously Head of School of Literature and Languages at the University of Reading, where she also founded the research theme "Minority Identities: Rights and Representations". Her primary research field is anglophone postcolonial literature, and she has been published widely on Caribbean and Black British literature. Much of her academic work also focuses questions relating to gender and sexual identities and the intersections between feminism and postcolonialism.

Life
After leaving secondary school she was educated at UWC Atlantic College, and at the same time her parents moved to India. She  obtained her bachelor's degree in English and American literature from Warwick University and her PhD from the Centre for Caribbean Studies.

Academic career
Donnell is the leading researcher of the Leverhulme Trust funded project Caribbean Literary Heritage: Recovering the Lost Past and Safeguarding the Future. She has been awarded a number of research grants and fellowships, including a visiting Hurst fellowship, Department of English, Washington University in St. Louis and the James M. Osborne Fellowship in English Literature and History, Yale Beinecke Rare Book and Manuscript Library. In 2013 she was awarded a research fellowship by the AHRC to research sexual citizenship and queerness in the Caribbean, addressing the criminalization and intolerance of homosexuality in the region by contesting heteronormativity rather than homophobia. Donnell's work uses literature to show how sexual pluralism and indeterminacy are part of the Caribbean cultural world. She worked with CAISO, the Caribbean IRN and the IGDS at UWI on a series of public events called Sexualities in the Tent.

Her interests in literary histories and archives has led to an International Network led by a group of colleagues the University of Reading and funded by the Leverhulme Trust to help retain authors' papers and manuscripts with a particular focus on Diasporic Literary Archives.

Her archival interests have also led to her development and directorship of a Doctoral Training Programme in Collections-Based Research at the University of Reading. This postgraduate training provides a pathway to a PhD, with a focus on museum and archives skills training and placement opportunities.

She was a founding and joint editor of the quarterly journal Interventions: International Journal of Postcolonial Studies from 1998 to 2011, and has an editorial role in The Journal of West Indian Literature and is a Trustee of Wasafiri magazine.

Works
Donnell has co-edited two major textbooks in the field of anglophone Caribbean literature. The Routledge Reader in Caribbean Literature (1996) recovered many lesser-known literary works, especially those published before the so-called "boom" of the 1950s. The Routledge Companion to Anglophone Caribbean Literature (2011) brings together three generations of critics to map a scholarly reassessment of the field.

Donnell’s academic publications on recovery research of the poetry of Una Marson, and her edited collection of Marson’s Selected Poems (part of Peepal Tree's Caribbean Classics series), have been particularly significant. Although celebrated as a pioneering black Jamaican feminist and nationalist, Marson’s literary works were often dismissed for mimicking European style. Donnell has repeatedly argued that Marson’s poetry powerfully represents her complicated relationship to both nationalism and feminism

Donnell's essay "Visibility, Violence and Voice? Attitudes to Veiling Post-11 September" appeared in Veil: Veiling, Representation and Contemporary Art arranged by David A. Bailey. The essay gained attention because of its discussion of the veil as a symbol of political and cultural identity in the Muslim world. Donnell discusses how the West's concentration on the veil diverts attention from other issues such as legal rights, education and access to healthcare, connecting to debates within Islamic feminism.

Main publications
 
 
 
 
 
 
 
Reprinted in:

References

External links
 "Alison Donnell's publications". English Literature, University of Reading.

Academics of the University of East Anglia
Academics of the University of Reading
Alumni of the University of Warwick
British feminists
British women academics
Literary scholars
Living people
People educated at a United World College
People educated at Atlantic College
Year of birth missing (living people)
Washington University in St. Louis fellows
Yale University fellows